Gareth Rowe (born 17 January 1977) is a football (soccer) player who plays for Canterbury United and has represented New Zealand at international level.

Club career
Rowe is recognised as one of the best defenders in New Zealand domestic football.  When the decision was made in 2003 to play New Zealand's national league as a summer competition he declined to take part but decided for the 09-10 season, potentially the last one for summer football, to play for Canterbury United.

International career
Rowe represented New Zealand at under 20 level before making his full All Whites debut as a substitute in a 7-0 win over Papua New Guinea on 11 June 1997 and ended his international playing career with seven A-international caps to his credit, his last cap an appearance in a 2-0 win over Malaysia on 19 August 2000.

References

External links
 Gareth Rowe interview

1977 births
Living people
New Zealand association footballers
New Zealand international footballers
Association football defenders